Lapillus (plural lapilli) may refer to:

 Lapilli, a size classification term for tephra
 One of the otoliths in finfish
 Lapillus, a South Korean girl group